Kathon Kenroy St. Hillaire (born 5 November 1997) is a Trinidadian footballer who plays for Polish side KS Krapkowice. He last played for Slovak Second Division club FK Poprad.

Career statistics

Club

Notes

International

References

External links
 Kathon St. Hillaire at CaribbeanFootballDatabase

Living people
1997 births
Sportspeople from Port of Spain
Association football forwards
Trinidad and Tobago footballers
Trinidad and Tobago expatriate footballers
Trinidad and Tobago international footballers
St. Ann's Rangers F.C. players
Defence Force F.C. players
1. SC Znojmo players
ŠKF Sereď players
FK Poprad players
San Juan Jabloteh F.C. players
Slovak Super Liga players
2. Liga (Slovakia) players
Czech National Football League players
Expatriate footballers in the Czech Republic
Trinidad and Tobago expatriate sportspeople in the Czech Republic
Expatriate footballers in Slovakia
Trinidad and Tobago expatriate sportspeople in Slovakia
Trinidad and Tobago under-20 international footballers